Planet of the Gods is the eleventh studio album by American rapper Killah Priest. It was released on June 4, 2015 on Proverbs Records. The album was entirely produced by Dutch production team Godz Wrath and has no guest appearances.

Track list 

Album cover artwork done by:
 Jason Cardona /Orign at Futprnts Workshop 2015

References 

Killah Priest albums
2015 albums